The Diamanten Kogel (i.e. Diamond Bullet) is an annual award for the best original Dutch crime novel. It is awarded by the Genootschap van Vlaamse Misdaadauteurs in Belgium. The Gouden Strop is its counterpart in the Netherlands.

The award consists of a silver knuckle-duster with four diamonds, designed by Wim Delvoye.

Winners
2013: 2017 Rudy Soetewey
2012: Blauw Goud Almar Otten
2011: Roomservice Elvin Post
2010: Wrede schoonheid Mieke de Loof
2009: Stiletto Libretto Bavo Dhooge
2008: Pentito Simon de Waal
2007: Starr Patrick Conrad
2006: Het diepe water Felix Thijssen
2005: Onder druk Esther Verhoef
2004: Medeschuldig Bob Mendes
2003: Dossier K. Jef Geeraerts
2002: De Emerson locomotief Benny Baudewyns

See also
 Dutch literature

External links
 

Belgian literary awards
Awards established in 2002
2002 establishments in Belgium